HMS Garth was a Type I Hunt-class destroyer of the Royal Navy built by John Brown & Company on the River Clyde, and launched on 28 December 1939. She was adopted by the Civil Community of Wokingham, Berkshire, as part of the Warship Week campaign in 1942.

Service history
On commissioning in 1940 Garth completed work ups for service in Home waters, including the Northwestern approaches and the English Channel. She provided escort cover for the monitor  during the evacuation of Dunkirk. In November 1940 along with  she sunk the E-Boat S38 off Southwold - the first E-Boat sunk during an attack on a coastal convoy.

During 1941 and 1942 she continued escort duties for convoy defence off the East coast. In 1942 she was nominated to provide cover for the Dieppe Raid (Operation Jubilee) in August 1942. Following this the destroyer continued duties in the English Channel and North sea. In February 1943 Garth rammed and sank the E-Boat S73 off Yarmouth.

In April 1944 Garth was nominated to provide support for the Allied landings in Normandy. In October 1944 she provided naval gunfire support ahead of the Allied assault on Walcheren, which defended the Scheldt estuary and port of Antwerp. She then returned to convoy escort and patrol duties in the North Sea.

In August 1945, she attended the first British Navy week in a foreign port, in Rotterdam. Also there were the cruiser HMS Bellona, and the destroyer Onslow as well as the submarine Tuna. Foreign vessels included two of the Dutch Navy submarines of the T-class, Dolfijn and Zeehond.

After August 1945 she was used as an accommodation ship at Chatham. She was subsequently placed in reserve. She was then sold to Thos. W. Ward for scrap. She arrived for scrapping at Barrow on 25 August 1958.

References

Publications

External links
 Profile on naval-history.net

 

Hunt-class destroyers of the Royal Navy
Naval ships of Operation Neptune
Ships built on the River Clyde
1940 ships
World War II destroyers of the United Kingdom